Matthew Butler was a military commander and politician.

Matthew Butler may also refer to:

Matthew Butler (American football) (born 1999), American football player
Matthew Butler (Tiswas) (born 1974), child performer who appeared on Saturday morning children's show Tiswas
Matthew E. Butler, visual effects supervisor